The 1926 Montana Grizzlies football team represented the University of Montana in the 1926 college football season as a member of the Pacific Coast Conference (PCC). The Grizzlies were led by first-year head coach Frank W. Milburn, played their home games at Dornblaser Field and finished the season with a record of three wins and five losses (3–5, 0–4 PCC).

Schedule

References

Montana
Montana Grizzlies football seasons
Montana Grizzlies football